Marshall's fig parrot (Cyclopsitta diophthalma marshalli) is a subspecies of double-eyed fig parrot from the Cape York Peninsula.

Measuring 13–15 cm tall, it is bright green. The male has red facial markings. The female has blue and grey facial markings.

It usually lives in rainforests. It feeds on figs, fruit and nectar.

References

Cyclopsitta
Birds of Cape York Peninsula
Birds described in 1946